Jack Douglas is an American record producer. He is known for his work with John Lennon and Yoko Ono, Patti Smith, Cheap Trick, and the New York Dolls, among other rock artists in the 1970s and 1980s; notably he produced three successful albums for Aerosmith.

Early life and education 
Jack Douglas was born in the Bronx in 1947, New York City. He was trained at the Institute of Audio Research and was a member of its first graduating class.

Career 
Starting out as a folk musician and performer, he worked on Robert F. Kennedy's 1964 senatorial campaign as a songwriter. Douglas then moved to England and joined a succession of bands before returning to New York to attend the Institute of Audio Research.

His first professional job was at the then-new Record Plant, not as a producer or engineer, but as a studio janitor. Soon he was working at the recording desk, as a recording engineer, contributing to projects by Miles Davis, The James Gang, Alice Cooper, Cheap Trick, Montrose, Rough Cutt, Artful Dodger, Moxy, Flipp, and Mountain.

A chance encounter with a group member led Douglas to help engineer the Who's 1971 Record Plant sessions for the aborted Lifehouse project. Songs developed from these sessions were later included on Who's Next (1971).  Douglas was then given the opportunity to engineer John Lennon's classic Imagine album in 1971. Douglas and Lennon formed a close bond and worked together for the remainder of Lennon's life.

As a Record Plant staff engineer, Douglas also forged working relationships with Patti Smith, Blue Öyster Cult, the New York Dolls, Cheap Trick, Starz, and most notably Aerosmith. It was during the recording of the New York Dolls' first album that Douglas was encouraged by producer Bob Ezrin to also consider becoming a record producer.

Douglas engineered and produced many of Aerosmith's albums in the 1970s, including Get Your Wings (1974), Toys in the Attic (1975), Rocks (1976) and Draw the Line (1977), all of which have gone multi-platinum. Toys in the Attic and Rocks broke Aerosmith into the mainstream and have become highly influential, with both albums ranking among Rolling Stones list of the 500 Greatest Albums of All Time.

The close relationship between Douglas and Aerosmith extended beyond producing and engineering, as Douglas was also a musical contributor to the group when they came up short of material on their projects. For example, Douglas helped write the band's 1978 hit "Kings and Queens". He was often given the nickname of "the sixth member" of Aerosmith, due to his close relationship with the band. Douglas was replaced as producer by the band for the 1979 release Night in the Ruts, but Douglas was to again work with the group on 1982's Rock in a Hard Place and several of Aerosmith guitarist Joe Perry's solo albums. For much of the late 1980s, 1990s, and early 2000s, Aerosmith worked with other producers, but in the mid-2000s, they re-united with Douglas on the 2004 blues cover album Honkin' on Bobo. Douglas also produced the band's album Music from Another Dimension! in 2012, himself providing the narration on the album's opening track "LUV XXX", parodying the style of narration from The Outer Limits.

In 1980, Douglas was working as producer with John Lennon and Yoko Ono on their Double Fantasy album (for which he shared a Grammy Award for Album of the Year). During the same sessions he worked on a follow-up Lennon/Ono album, Milk and Honey, but Lennon's murder on December 8, 1980 cut that project short. An unfinished version of the album was released in 1984. Douglas was later involved in litigation with Ono over unpaid royalties from Double Fantasy.

Since then he has kept working as an engineer and producer, reuniting with Aerosmith for three more albums and producing albums for artists such as Supertramp, Zebra, Clutch, Local H, Slash's Snakepit  and, in 2006, the return of the New York Dolls.

Douglas also teaches a studio etiquette class at Ex'pression College for Digital Arts.

References

External links 
 Jack Douglas video interview series
 Interview with Jack Douglas
Part 1 – The Dream  (breaking into the industry)
 Part 2 – Searching For Sound (passion for sound and his early career as a musician)
 Part 3 – Blowing Up In The Music Business (early days as professional engineer, recording demos for Patti LaBelle and meeting John Lennon)
Jack Douglas Interview, NAMM Oral History Library (2017)

Record producers from New York (state)
American audio engineers
Grammy Award winners
Living people
Businesspeople from New York City
Engineers from New York City
People from the Bronx
1945 births